The Alfred Tredway White Memorial is a memorial by American sculptor Daniel Chester French dedicated to Alfred Tredway White. It is located in the Brooklyn Botanic Garden, in the U.S. state of New York. White was an early benefactor of the Brooklyn Botanic Garden.

Description
The sculpture allegorically depicts White's association with the Botanic Garden with a bas-relief of Mother Nature removing branches from a laurel bush to make a wreath. In addition to his name and years, engraved are the words, "Lover of Nature · Helper of Mankind · Beloved of All".

The monument was dedicated on June 7, 1923, but the original stele by architect Henry Bacon was destroyed and the original moved to the Botanic Garden auditorium. A replacement was erected in 1990.

References

External links
 

1923 establishments in New York City
1923 sculptures
1990 establishments in New York City
1990 sculptures
Allegorical sculptures in New York City
Monuments and memorials in Brooklyn
Outdoor sculptures in Brooklyn
Plants in art
Sculptures by Daniel Chester French
Sculptures of women in New York City